The yellow-margined flatbill or Zimmer's flatbill (Tolmomyias assimilis)  is a species of bird in the tyrant flycatcher family Tyrannidae. It is found in humid forest in southern Central America, and the Chocó and Amazon in South America. 

There are significant differences (notably voice) between the populations east and west of the Andes, leading to suggestions that the two should be regarded as separate species, in which case the population west of the Andes retains the English name yellow-margined flatbill (or flycatcher) but with the scientific name T. flavotectus, while the Amazonian population retains the scientific name T. assimilis but with the English name Zimmer's flatbill (or flycatcher).

Both population closely resemble the yellow-olive flatbill, and are typically best separated from that species by voice.

References

External link
Xeno-canto: audio recordings of Zimmer's flatbill

Tolmomyias
Birds of the Amazon Basin
Birds of the Guianas
Birds described in 1868
Birds of Brazil
Taxonomy articles created by Polbot